Synchronize It! is a file synchronization software which allows users to compare and synchronize folders that can be stored on the same computer, on different computers, in archives or on FTP sites. Various synchronization modes (actions) and comparison rules are available.

Features

Folders comparison 
The most common application of Synchronize It! is to compare two folders — a source folder and a target folder. Users can choose whether subfolders should be included (allowing exclusion of specific subfolders), whether only matching folders should be compared and users can apply file filters. Various actions and comparison modes are available (see below). Custom sessions can be saved and organized into projects.

Compare folder with archive 
Zip archives are supported internally and external archivers can be used to support other archive types. Archives support allows users to: 
create backup archives from folders;
 compare folders content with archived version and update it; 
 compare and synchronize two archives with each other.

Command line switches 
Synchronize It! can also be started and configured from command line. This allows automation and implementation in other tools, such as Total Commander.

Synchronize non-connected PCs 
The package feature can be used to synchronize distant, non-connected PCs. A list of the files contained in the source folder is stored in a small package file, that can be kept on a USB stick. The package is then synchronized with the target folder on another computer. Files only present or modified on the target computer will be packed into the package. A package hence contains only the files that are different and not the entire folder, which makes it a tool to keep non-connected computers synchronized (e.g. a PC at work and a PC at home).

Reporting and printing  
Results form comparison can be printed or exported and published as HTML reports.

Portability 
Synchronize It! also works without installation and is only 2.5 MB in size. It can be run directly from a USB stick.

Actions 
The following actions / synchronization modes are available:

Comparison rules 

1 Date comparison in all rules takes into account global time-related options, such as Ignore 2 secs difference etc.

See also 
 File synchronization  
 Comparison of file synchronization software
 Windows Live FolderShare 
 SyncToy
 Beyond Compare
 GoodSync

References

External links 
 
 Developer
 Development blog
 Support forum
 Article on how to implement Synchronize It! in Total Commander

Synchronize It